Local elections in Siquijor were held on May 13, 2019 as part of the 2019 Philippine general election. Voters elected all local posts in the province: town mayors, vice mayors, town councilors, as well as members of the Sangguniang Panlalawigan - three in each of the province's two administrative districts, the governor, vice governor, and one representative for lone district of Siquijor.

A total of 188 hopefuls ran for all local positions in the province and in six municipalities of province.

The total number of registered voters in the province is 76,225 which had an increase 10.49%
from 68,988 in 2016. Siquijor has 450 precinct venues and 147 clustered precincts.

Congressional Election Result

Lone District, Congressman
Municipality: Enrique Villanueva, Larena, Lazi, Maria, San Juan, Siquijor
Population (2019):  95,984
Electorate (2019):  76,225

Ramon Vicente Antonio Rocamora is the incumbent.

Provincial Election Results

Governor
Zaldy Villa is the incumbent. Parties are stated in their certificates of candidacy.

Vice-Governor
Mei Ling Minor-Quezon is the incumbent.

Sangguniang Panlalawigan

1st District
Municipalities: Enrique Villanueva, Larena, Siquijor
Parties are as stated in their certificates of candidacy.

|bgcolor=black colspan=5|

2nd District
Municipalities: Maria, Lazi, San Juan
Parties are as stated in their certificates of candidacy. 

|bgcolor=black colspan=5|

Municipal Election Results
The mayor and vice mayor with the highest number of votes win the seat; they are voted separately, therefore, they may be of different parties when elected. Below is results of mayoral and vice-mayoral elections of each municipalities of the province.

Enrique Villanueva
Electorate (2019):  5,329
Gerold Pal-ing is the incumbent.

Leonardo Paculba is the incumbent.

Larena
Electorate (2019):  15,827
Dean Villa is the incumbent.

Cyrus Vincent Marchan Calibo is the incumbent.

Lazi
Electorate (2019):  15,827
James Monte is the incumbent.

Earl Aljas is the incumbent.

Maria
Electorate (2019):  11,157
Meynard Asok is the incumbent.

Ivy Dan Samson is the incumbent.

San Juan
Electorate (2019):  11,325
Alberto Ocay is the incumbent.

Gemma Magtagad-Cenas is the incumbent.

Siquijor
Electorate (2019):  21,097
Richard Quezon is the incumbent.

Joy Abe Lopes de Andrade is the incumbent.

References

External links
COMELEC - Official website of the Philippine Commission on Elections (COMELEC)
NAMFREL - Official website of National Movement for Free Elections (NAMFREL)
PPCRV - Official website of the Parish Pastoral Council for Responsible Voting (PPCRV)

2019 Philippine local elections
Politics of Siquijor
May 2019 events in the Philippines